Alpes (French and Latin for 'Alps') may refer to:

Places 
Alpes-de-Haute-Provence (formerly Basses-Alpes), a French department in the south of France
Hautes-Alpes, a department in southeastern France
Alpes-Maritimes, a department in the extreme southeast corner of France
Montes Alpes, a mountain range in the northern part of the Moon's near side

Other uses 
Catherine Ribeiro + Alpes, a French rock band of the 1970s

See also 
 Alps (disambiguation)